Marina Kurnossova (born 24 August 2000) is a Kazakhstani professional racing cyclist, who last rode for the UCI Women's Team  during the 2019 women's road cycling season.

References

External links

2000 births
Living people
Kazakhstani female cyclists
Place of birth missing (living people)
Cyclists at the 2018 Summer Youth Olympics
21st-century Kazakhstani women